Docwra, also with spelling Dockwra, Dockwray, Dockray and other variants, is an English language surname, of Norse-Viking origin, which was significant in London and East Anglia in the 17th century. It may refer to:

Anne Docwra (1624–1710), English Quaker minister, religious writer and philanthropist
Edmund Docwra (fl.1571–2), English politician, father of Henry, 1st Baron Docwra 
Graham Dockray (born 1946), British physiologist
Henry Docwra, 1st Baron Docwra (1564–1631), English-born soldier and statesman in Ireland
Mary Dockray-Miller (born 1965), American medievalist
Thomas Docwra (1458?–1527), Grand Prior of the English Knights Hospitaller
Tracy Dockray (born 1962), American artist
William Dockwra  (c.1635–1716), English merchant

English-language surnames